The Wuthathi, also known as the Mutjati, are an Aboriginal Australian people of the state of Queensland. Anthropologist Norman Tindale distinguished the Mutjati from the Otati, whereas AIATSIS treats the two ethnonyms as variants related to the one ethnic group, the Wuthathi.

Language
Wuthathi is considered to have been a dialect of the Uradhi branch of the Paman languages.

A list of some 400 words of the Otati language was taken down by Charles Gabriel Seligman, and a further 60 by George Pimm, members of Cambridge Anthropological Expedition to Torres Straits in the late 19th century.

Country
The area around Shelburne Bay has been described as some of "the most beautiful coastal and island country in Australia, if not the world", and was home to over 30 rare and threatened species of fauna as the double-wattled cassowary and the palm cockatoo. One report. issued after the battle for the conservation of Shelburne Bay from silica mining had been won, stated of Shelburne, together with the Cape Flattery duneland:
The extraordinary landscapes of these two largest dunefields make a lasting impression on all who view them. Active, large elongated parabolic dunes rise like snow-clad hills above vegetation and/or lake filled swales. Low ridges (<2m high) in repeated v-shapes form so called Gegenwalle ground patterns within the dunefields, that are the best developed and largest in the world.

Donald Thomson places the Otati on the coast south of Oxford Bay down to Margaret Bay. Tindale's distinction of the Otati with the Mutjati is not accepted by AIATSIS, which regards the two as variants of the one name.

Mythology
Wuthathi origin stories focus on their totem, the Diamond stingray, in Wuthathi called yama, which had been washed up on shore and flipped on its back during a tempest, exposing its pure white belly, a tale which apparently had an aetiological purpose for explaining the dazzling white silica dunes characteristic of the site.

Lifestyle and economy
The Otati were one of the Kawadji, or sandbeach people, like the Pakadji, Olkola and others, who lived along the coast facing the Coral Sea and fished for food in the rivers and ocean.

History of contact
The Wuthathi were uprooted from the Shelburne Bay area and forcefully herded by the Queensland Government down to the Lockhart Mission where they were forbidden to practice their customs or speak their language. The land they were dispossessed of was then leased out to white pastoralists.

The consortium produced documentation claiming that the Wuthathi people were extinct, though one descendant, Alik Pablo, artfully demonstrated his knowledge of the bay when miners lawyers tested him with an upturned map to confuse him. Despite a ruling by the Mining Warden in favour of the indigenous people, the government of Joh Bjelke-Petersen persisted in ignoring the decision. Eventually the then Prime Minister Bob Hawke, included the Shelburne Bay in one of the four conservation areas he marked out as crucial to the national interest, the others being The Daintree Wet Tropics, Kakadu and the Tasmanian Wilderness.

In 2016, after a century of dispossession, the Wuthathi right to 118,000 hectares of this spectacular coastal landscape was recognized.

Alternative names

 Empikeno
 Idjonyengadi
 Mudjadi, Mutjati, Mutyati
 Mutyati
 Odadi, Ojnandi, Onyengadi, Onyengadi
 Oradhi, Otati
 Oyonggo, Oyungo
 Umtadee
 Unjadi, Unyadi
 Wotadi, Wotati
 Wudjadi, Wudjadi
 Wundjur, Wutati, Wutati

Source:

Notes

Citations

Sources

Aboriginal peoples of Queensland